Sang-e Deraz (also Romanized as Sang-e Derāz) is a village in Zardeyn Rural District, Nir District, Taft County, Yazd Province, Iran. At the 2006 census, its population was 207, in 78 families.

References 

Populated places in Taft County